This is a partial list of streams of Cape Verde, sorted by island.

Boa Vista
Ribeira do Rabil

Santiago
Ribeira Grande de Santiago/Ribeira Cadacina 
Ribeira Principal
Ribeira Seca
Ribeira da Trindade

Santo Antão
Ribeira de Alto Mira
Ribeira da Cruz
Ribeira da Garça
Ribeira Grande
Ribeira da Janela
Ribeira das Patas
Ribeira do Paul
Ribeira da Torre

São Vicente
Ribeira do Calhau
Ribeira de Julião

See also
Geography of Cape Verde

 
Cape Verde
Rivers